Antoine Uyterhoeven (born 12 April 1930) is a Belgian sprinter. He competed in the men's 400 metres at the 1952 Summer Olympics.

References

External links

1930 births
Possibly living people
Athletes (track and field) at the 1952 Summer Olympics
Belgian male sprinters
Olympic athletes of Belgium